Mahoningtown also known as "Motown" is a neighborhood in the southwestern part of the city of New Castle, Pennsylvania, United States. Though it is named for the nearby Mahoning River, the city actually sits on the banks of the Shenango River.  The two rivers merge and become the Beaver River just south of the city.

Mahoningtown is located in Lawrence County at latitude 40.975 and longitude -80.372. Located about two and one-half miles south of New Castle in Taylor township, Mahoningtown was at one time a separate municipality before being annexed by New Castle. Mahoningtown officially became the seventh ward of New Castle, Pennsylvania in 1898.

History 

William Simpson, from Butler County, was the first settler to arrive in Mahoningtown. Arriving in 1836, he is credited with opening Mahoningtown's first store. That same year, Pittsburgh residents Benjamin Darlington and William Hayes laid out the town on five hundred acres of property they owned. In 1844, a general store was opened by Archibald Newell, who came to Mahoningtown from Crawford County. Mahoningtown's first postmaster was John Gillespie.

Transportation and access 
Routes 18 and 108 pass through Mahoningtown, while U.S. Route 422 passes over the city on the New Castle Bypass.

References

External links 
Mahoningtown mural by Erin the Painter
Mahoningtown Panoramio photos

Neighborhoods in Pennsylvania
Populated places in Lawrence County, Pennsylvania